The 2014 Winnipeg Blue Bombers season was the 57th season for the team in the Canadian Football League and their 82nd overall. The Blue Bombers finished with a 7–11 record, although this was a four-game improvement upon their disastrous 3–15 record from 2013, the Blue Bombers still finished last place in the West Division and failed to make the playoffs for the third straight year. It was also the fifth time in six seasons that the Blue Bombers would fail to qualify for the CFL playoffs.

The Blue Bombers played in the West Division after having played in the East Division for eight seasons.

Offseason

CFL Draft
The 2014 CFL Draft took place on May 13, 2014. The Blue Bombers had five selections in the seven-round draft, after trading their original second-round selection and Alex Hall to Saskatchewan for Patrick Neufeld and a fourth round selection in the 2015 CFL Draft. They traded two third round picks, another obtained from Toronto, to Saskatchewan to get back into the second round. Finally their fifth-round selection was traded along with Anthony Woodson to Toronto for the other third-round selection and Marc Parenteau.

Preseason

Regular season

Standings

Schedule

Team

Roster

Coaching staff

References

Winnipeg Blue Bombers seasons
2014 Canadian Football League season by team
2014 in Manitoba